Laurie Schlegel is an American politician who is a member of the Louisiana House of Representatives from the 82nd district. She assumed office on May 10, 2021.

Education 
Schlegel attended St. Mary's Dominican High School in New Orleans. She earned a Bachelor of Science degree in psychology from Louisiana State University and a Master of Arts in marriage and family counseling from the New Orleans Baptist Theological Seminary.

Career 
Schlegel began her career as a sales manager for Marriott International. From 2001 to 2011, she was a pharmaceutical sales representative for AstraZeneca. In 2014 and 2015, she was a counselor for Catholic Counseling Services. Since 2015, she has worked for Lighthouse Counseling Center. She was elected to the Louisiana House of Representatives in a May 2021 special election, succeeding Charles Henry.

Schlegel has supported legislation that would ban transgender students from competing on girls' sports teams in schools.

References 

Living people
Republican Party members of the Louisiana House of Representatives
People from New Orleans
Politicians from New Orleans
Louisiana State University alumni
New Orleans Baptist Theological Seminary alumni
Women state legislators in Louisiana
Year of birth missing (living people)